Kevin Scott Mackintosh (born 30 August 1957 in Surbiton) is a retired English first-class cricketer, active 1978–83, who played for Nottinghamshire and Surrey.

References

1957 births
English cricketers
Nottinghamshire cricketers
Surrey cricketers
Living people
People from Surbiton
20th-century English people